Kamer van Koophandel en Fabrieken voor Amsterdam v Inspire Art Ltd (2003) C-167/01 is a leading corporate law case, concerning the EU law of freedom of establishment for companies.

Facts
The art company "Inspire Art Ltd" claimed that the Dutch law requirement for a minimum capital to operate in the Netherlands was an unjustified restriction on its right to freedom of establishment (now under TFEU article 49). The company was incorporated in the United Kingdom, which accords to the "incorporation theory" rather than the "real seat theory" of establishing a business in conflict of laws. It wished to carry out business in the Netherlands, running an Amsterdam art studio. Dutch law, however, applied to pseudoforeign companies to impose minimum capital requirements on businesses operating within the country. When the Dutch authorities required the company to comply with Dutch law, the question was whether that disproportionately interfered with Inspire Art Ltd's right to freedom of establishment.

Judgment
The Court of Justice held that creditor protection did not justify imposing additional requirements to those of the United Kingdom, where Inspire Art Ltd was incorporated. In this case, creditors were sufficiently protected by the fact that the company held itself out not as a Dutch company but one subject to UK law. The minimum capital requirements were a disproportionate method of achieving the aim of creditor protection.

See also

UK company law
European company law

US cases
Liggett v. Lee 288 U.S. 517 (1933)

References
M Andenas, 'Free Movement of Companies' (2003) 119 LQR 221
P Dyrberg, 'Full Free Movement of Companies in the European Community at Last' [2003] ELR 528
WF Ebke, 'Centros – Some Realities and Some Mysteries' (2000) 48 American Journal of Comparative Law 623

External links
Inspire Art Ltd

United Kingdom company case law
Court of Justice of the European Union case law
2003 in case law
Dutch case law
2003 in the Netherlands
2003 in British law
European Union company case law